Psychiatric Services is a monthly peer-reviewed medical journal publishing research on psychiatry. It is published by the American Psychiatric Association and is edited by Lisa Dixon.

The journal was founded in 1950 by Daniel Blain, APA's first medical director, as the A.P.A. Mental Hospital Service Bulletin. It is published "for mental health professionals and others concerned with treatment and services for persons with mental illnesses and mental disabilities, in keeping with APA's objectives to improve care and treatment, to promote research and professional education in psychiatric and related fields, and to advance the standards of all psychiatric services and facilities."

The journal is abstracted and/or indexed by Journal Citation Reports/Science Edition (Thomson ISI), Medline/PubMed, Science Citation Index Expanded, SciFinder, SciSearch, Scopus and Web of Science, among others. According to the Journal Citation Reports, the journal has a 2016 impact factor of 2.539.

References

External links 
 Psychiatric Services journal website

Publications established in 1950
Psychiatry journals
1950 establishments in the United States
American Psychiatric Association academic journals